Alexander Grigoryevich Chervyakov (Aliaksandr Charviakou, Aliaksandr Ryhoravič Čarviakoŭ , Aleksandr Grigor'evič Červjakov; 25 February 1892 — 16 June 1937) was a Soviet Politician and revolutionary and one of the founders of the Communist Party of Byelorussia, who eventually became the leader of the Byelorussian Soviet Socialist Republic. Chervyakov became the first chairman of the Belarusian Sovnarkom and in 1918 was appointed as a narkom of Belnatskom (Belarusian Nationality Committee) that was established in the Russian Narkomnat on Nationalities headed by Joseph Stalin. 

He is considered an “engine” of the policy of Belarusisation in the 1920s, working to establish a Belarusian national university, preserve cultural artefacts and protect historical monuments. 

Born at Dukorki in 1892, he joined the Bolshevik Party in May 1917 and began to gain power quickly.  He was appointed chairman of the Military Revolutionary Committee of Minsk in 1920, and because of that position, was involved in the creation of the Soviet Union.  He was elected as one of the first four Chairmen of the Central Executive Committee of the USSR on 30 December 1922 when the Union of Soviet Socialist Republics was formed.  He held that position until he was accused of “anti-Soviet activities” and committed suicide on 16 June 1937 in order to avoid Stalin's Great Purge. He was posthumously exonerated during the Khrushchev Thaw in 1957.

References

External links
 http://www.archontology.org/nations/ussr/ussr_state/chervyakov.php Biography

1892 births
1937 deaths
People from Puchavičy District
People from Igumensky Uyezd
Old Bolsheviks
Socialist Soviet Republic of Byelorussia people
Lithuanian–Byelorussian Soviet Socialist Republic people
Members of the Central Committee of the Communist Party of Byelorussia
Heads of government of the Byelorussian Soviet Socialist Republic
Central Executive Committee of the Soviet Union members
Members of the Central Executive Committee of the Byelorussian Soviet Socialist Republic
Soviet politicians who committed suicide
Belarusian politicians who committed suicide
Suicides in the Soviet Union